Nørhalne is a town in North Jutland, Denmark. It is located in Jammerbugt Municipality.

References

Cities and towns in the North Jutland Region
Jammerbugt Municipality